The President of the Rhode Island Senate is the presiding officer of the Rhode Island Senate. Unlike most other states, the Lieutenant Governor of Rhode Island does not preside of the state senate. Instead, the lieutenant governor has roles in "emergency preparedness and homeland security". 

The role of president was established in 2003. Rhode Island Constitution provides that the lieutenant governor would no longer preside over the Senate in 2003, and power would be transferred to a president elected by senators. The first elected president was Joseph A. Montalbano, a Democrat from North Providence.

List

References

Government of Rhode Island
Politics of Rhode Island
Presidents of the Rhode Island State Senate
Rhode Island state senators